Christiaan Eijkman (1858–1930) was a Dutch physician, professor of physiology and Nobel laureate.
 Johan Fredrik Eijkman (1851–1915), a chemist

Eijkman may also refer to several places named in his honor:
 Eijkman (crater), a crater on the Moon
 9676 Eijkman, an asteroid
 Eijkman Point, a place in Antarctica
 Eijkman test.